Van Go is the second album by the American rock band the Beat Farmers, released in 1986. It was the band's first album for Curb Records.

The album peaked at No. 135 on the Billboard 200.

Production
The guitarist Buddy Blue left the band during the recording sessions for Van Go; he was replaced by Joey Harris. The album was produced by Craig Leon. Beat Farmers drummer Country Dick Montana later described the album as having "'more of an AOR sound.'"

Critical reception

The Washington Post wrote that the Beat Farmers "sing about the barroom world of retooled cars, busted marriages and dead-end jobs ... The band is as capable of irony as [Lou] Reed or [Neil] Young, but the Beat Farmers never allow it to interfere with their back-to-back basics attack." Robert Christgau thought that "except for the deadpan 'Gun Sale at the Church' and maybe the Johnny Cash impressions, their country-rock is now proudly generic." 

Trouser Press called the album "amiable but rather thin." The Toronto Star opined that the "best thing about the Beat Farmers is that they make no outrageous claims for themselves; their music is honest and earthy, but it doesn't pretend to defend the dignity of the working man, free enterprise, the American Way."

AllMusic praised the "amazing cover of Neil Young's 'Powderfinger', which sounds like it was written for the band."

Track listing

Personnel
Buddy Blue - guitar
Rolle Dexter - bass, vocals
Joey Harris - guitar
Country Dick Montana - drums, vocals
Jerry Raney - guitar, vocals

References

1986 albums
Curb Records albums